The Nation of Two World Tour was the fifth major concert tour by Australian singer and songwriter Vance Joy, in support of his second studio album, Nation of Two (2018). The tour began on March 6, 2018, in Leeds, England and concluded on November 30, 2018 in Berry, France.

Background
After finishing his Lay It On Me Tour in North America, Joy announced in November 2017 through social medias the dates of his next tour in Europe, which would begin on March 8, 2018 in Leeds, England to promote his second studio album and English singer Lily Moore was announced as the opening act.

On February 23, 2018, Joy released his second studio album Nation of Two. That same month, Joy announced that he would be touring North America, Oceania, South America and added more dates for Europe. In addition, it was announced that American band Lovelytheband, German singer Alice Merton, American singer Mondo Cozmo, Canadian singer Scott Helman, Australian band Cub Sport, Australian singer Jack River and Australian singer Didirri would be the opening act for different legs of the tour.

Critical response
Nation of Two World Tour was acclaimed by critics, praising the acting, the voice, and its connection to fans. Dana Jacobs from Music, Why Not! highlighted Joy's performance on stage by saying that: "Keogh and his band delivered a standout performance" and "Joy’s performance was sincerely joyful". In a review for Rezonatr Magazine, Elise Hines appreciated the show, saying: "Joy’s witty, writes catchy songs, and his live show proves that he has real chops and isn’t a studio concoction with no shadow of a doubt". Kathryn Baker, writing for The Hoya, acknowledged "With his humble presence, Joy proved that a simplistic stage and acoustic performance can still create an exciting and memorable concert experience".  

Music Connection critic Elena Ender appreciated the atmosphere of the concert, writing: "The indie folk tunes set up a wholesome and uplifting show, anchored by the Australian singer-songwriter. Transitioning between acoustic guitars and the ukulele, Vance Joy had a benevolent stage presence". Kathleen Leslie of Her Campus acknowledged that: "The show was absolutely fantastic. Vance Joy’s vocals live sound exactly like his album and he for sure knows how to get an audience up and singing".

Commercial performance
The tour topped 6th at the Billboard Hot Tours chart with Joy's shows between June 11 and 15 in New York, Washington and Boston grosseding $868,074.

Set list
This set list is from the show on April 21, 2018, in Phoenix. It is not intended to represent all concerts for the tour.

 "Call If You Need Me"
 "Mess Is Mine"
 "Like Gold"
 "Take Your Time"
 "Alone With Me"
 "Fire and the Flood"
 "I'm With You" 
 "Little Boy"
 "Bonnie & Clyde"
 "Wasted Time"
 "Georgia"
 "One of These Days"
 "All Night Long"  / "Sorry" 
 "We're Going Home"
 "Riptide"
 "Lay It on Me"
 "Saturday Sun"

Shows

Festivals and other miscellaneous performances
This concert was part of the "Coachella Valley Music and Arts Festival"
This concert was part of the "Beale Street Festival"
This concert was part of the "Shaky Knees Music Festival"
This concert was part of the "Celebrate Brooklyn!"
This concert was part of the "Firefly Music Festival"
This concert was part of the "Festival Lawn"
This concert was part of the "Forecastle Festival"
This concert was part of the "Sloss Music & Arts Festival"
This concert was part of the "Tecate Live Out"
This concert was part of the "Fairgrounds Festival"

References

2018 concert tours
Vance Joy concert tours